Karl Ewert Alvar Ljusberg (7 May 1945 – 1 October 2021) was a Swedish troubadour, ballad singer, entertainer, and the fictitious Republic of Jamtland's president from 1989 until his death. He lived in Hällekis.

Career 
During his career as a professional artist from 1971 he collaborated with many prominent ballad singers, for example Sid Jansson, Cornelis Vreeswijk, and Billey Shamrock. He also acted in Riksteaterns Joe Hill and in the musical Jesus Christ Superstar. He created several records throughout the years, from Goknul 1972 to Tack för kaffet 2003. Ljusberg also created records with Bengt Sändh, Iggesundsgänget, and his brother Arne Ljusberg. Most of his fame among the TV-audience came from his part as the storyteller in Har du hört den förut? (1983–1996) together with Margareta Kjellberg. Many of his texts are written in härjedalska (an umbrella term for northern dialects and languages spoken in Härjedalen).

Ewert Ljusberg was assigned president of Republic of Jamtland in 1989. He performed a show annually at the festival Storsjöyran in Östersund, where he gave a speech on Saturday night at midnight. Ljusberg gave, as president, birth to Jamtelagen, a counterpart to Jantelagen.

Discography 
 1972 – Goknul!
 1975 – Och inte kallar jag det att gråta...
 1977 – Possokongro (with Iggesundsgänget)
 1978 – Huvva för e' hippä!'''
 1979 – U' hunnsmjôlsposson (with Arne Ljusberg)
 1981 – Guds bästa barn 1983 – Skamgrepp (with Bengt Sändh)
 1984 – Lån' mä tänder (with Arne Ljusberg)
 1985 – Spökmatrosens sånger 1986 – Splitternya visor – Nils Ferlin (with Bernt Johansson)
 1992 – Spotlight – Ewert Ljusberg 1995 – Raw Roots (with Torgny "Kingen" Karlsson)
 1998 – Boca Louca Nights (recorded in São Tomé)
 2003 – Tack för kaffet 2006 – Ewert – livs levande 2006 – Ljusbergs väg 2008 – Songs for Beauties and Beasts2019 – Bär mig i ditt hjärta Filmography 
 1975 – Ställ krav på din arbetsmiljö! 2002 – Lilo & Stitch (in Swedish)
2018 – Tror du jag ljuger'' (TV-series)

Prizes and awards 
 1989 – Fred Åkerström grant
 2003 – Nils Ferlin-Sällskapets troubadour prize
 2006 – Cornelis Vreeswijk grant
 2008 – Ulf Peder Olrog grant

References

External links 
 Ewert Ljusberg's website 
Norrländsk uppslagsbok, Volume 3, 1995

 
 

1945 births
2021 deaths
Micronational leaders
Swedish television hosts
People from Härjedalen